Manchester Sports is a radio programme broadcast on BBC Radio Manchester whenever a major sport event involving a local team takes place. They are branded as the largest sports programme in the North West. The most common of these programmes is broadcast on a Saturday afternoon during the football season, usually starting at 2 o'clock and finishing at 6 o'clock with a live commentary game of one of the 3 o'clock games.

Presenters, commentators and summarisers

Jack Dearden
Jack Dearden is the main commentator for the Bolton Wanderers game but if Bolton are not the main commentary game, he will give updates from the game. Jack is also a presenter of Manchester Sports and usually presents the show when there is a midweek or Sunday game and also covers rugby league.  He also previously commentated for Oldham Athletic.

Bill Rice
Bill Rice is the sports editor at BBC Radio Manchester, presents Saturday Sport and commentates on Manchester United. He will also report at other local teams.

Liam Bradford
Liam Bradford is the main reporter for Manchester United. He is also the executive producer of BBC Squad Goals which goes out across BBC Local Radio on BBC Sounds during EFL match commentaries.

Dom Dietrich
Dom Dietrich is a commentator and reporter for local teams and Manchester United Women.

Mark Crossley 
Mark Crossley is a presenter of the programme.

Paul Rowley
Paul Rowley is the main reporter and summariser for Wigan Athletic and gives regular updates on the game.

Mike Minay
Mike Minay is the main commentator for Manchester City, he also presents the programme or does updates from other games.

Arthur Albiston
Arthur Albiston is an occasional summariser for Manchester United, and therefore rarely appears on the show.

Trevor Hunt
Trevor Hunt has been BBC Radio Manchester's Rugby League commentator since 1997 he also does occasional TV commentaries for The Super League Show and does commentaries on Leigh Leopards games for the Leigh club videos/DVDs and worked in BARLA's Press Office and was the Manager for the BARLA Great Britain team.

Stacey Copeland
Stacey Copeland was a former Boxer and Footballer who joined the station in 2019 to take over the presenting role of the Sunday Afternoon programme from Jack Dearden

Notable former presenters

Jimmy Wagg
Jimmy Wagg was the main Saturday presenter for Manchester Sports and is known for being a Manchester City fan. Jimmy began presenting the programme in 1988 and his last programme was on Saturday 1 August 2020. He commonly attends the commentary game but is also regularly in the Radio studio. He also presents the Sunday Morning Show. He has presented the show in its various guises since 1988. In September 2015 he reached a milestone of 1,000 shows as presenter of Manchester Sports. Jimmy presented the programme for over 30 years and never missed a Saturday until he stepped down at the end of the 2019-20 season after 32 years of presenting the Saturday programme.

Ian Cheeseman
Ian Cheeseman was the main commentator for the Manchester City as well as other local lower league games.

Local teams covered
Cricket
Lancashire
Football
Manchester City
Manchester United
Bolton Wanderers
Wigan Athletic
Rochdale
Oldham Athletic
Bury
Macclesfield Town
Stockport County
Altrincham
Salford City

Rugby League
Wigan Warriors
Warrington Wolves
Salford Red Devils
Leigh Leopards
Swinton Lions
Rochdale Hornets
Oldham Roughyeds

Rugby Union
Sale Sharks

References

Sport in Manchester
British sports radio programmes
BBC Local Radio programmes
BBC Radio Manchester programmes
BBC Radio Manchester